The Mayo Intermediate Football Championship is an annual Gaelic football competition contested by mid-tier (17-32) Mayo GAA clubs.

Ballyhaunis are the title holders (2022) defeating Kilmeena in the Final.

Honours
The winning club competes in the Connacht Intermediate Club Football Championship. They often do well there, with the likes of Westport (2016), Hollymount Carraroe (2015), Kiltane (2013) and Charlestown Sarsfields (2012) among the clubs from Mayo to win at least one Connacht Championship after winning the Mayo Intermediate Football Championship.

The winning club can, in turn, go on to play in the All-Ireland Intermediate Club Football Championship. In 2017, Westport, who counted among their players the reigning All Stars Footballer of the Year Lee Keegan, became the first club from Mayo to win an All-Ireland Intermediate Football Championship after winning the Connacht and Mayo Intermediate Football Championships.

The winning club is promoted to the Mayo Senior Football Championship.

The trophy presented to the winners is the Sweeney Cup.

History
Each year, the final takes place in McHale Park, Castlebar.

The most successful team to date are ? who have won on ? occasions.

The competition has taken place each year since 1965. The inaugural winners of the Mayo IFC that year were Garrymore.

In the 2020 final, Balla defeated Kiltimagh in a shock result.

List of finals

Wins listed by club

 Ballintubber (3): 1976, 1990, 2007

 Tuar Mhic Éadaigh (3): 1982, 2006, 2010

 Bonniconlon (2): 1986, 1997

 Kiltane (2): 1973, 2013

 Belmullet (2): 1974, 2018

 Westport (2): 2009, 2016

 Crossmolina Deel Rovers (1): 1980

 Davitts (1): 2011

 Hollymount Carramore (1): 2015

 Balla (1): 2020

References

Intermediate Gaelic football county championships
Football